Achillas was the 18th Patriarch of Alexandria, reigning from 312 to 313.

He was born in Alexandria, Egypt, and was renowned for his knowledge and piety; this was why Pope Theonas had ordained him priest and appointed him head of the Catechetical School of Alexandria upon the departure of Pierius. He was apparently very highly thought of for his work in Greek philosophy and theological science, as Pope Athanasius later described him by the honorific "Achillas the Great".

As recommended by Pope Peter, he was enthroned patriarch in December (Kiahk) 312 AD, after the martyrdom of Peter during the Diocletianic Persecution. He yielded to the request of Arius, who had been condemned by Peter, to return to his former position as priest and preacher.

Achillas died six months later on the 19th of Paoni (26 June), in 313.

After his death, Arius nominated himself to become Bishop of Alexandria, but the clergy and the people chose Alexander instead.

References

Sources

4th-century Popes and Patriarchs of Alexandria
Deans of the Catechetical School of Alexandria
Saints from Roman Egypt
4th-century Christian saints
313 deaths